Hassane Hamadi is a politician in Comoros. He was appointed Minister of Finance under Ahmed Abdallah Mohamed Sambi as of Sambi's inauguration on 28 May 2006.

References

Year of birth missing (living people)
Living people
Government ministers of the Comoros
Finance ministers of the Comoros